Albion is an archaic and poetic name for the island of Great Britain.

Albion may also refer to:

Arts and entertainment

Fictional elements
Albion (Blake), a character in the poetry of William Blake
Albion, a High School DxD character
Albion, the fictional setting of Fable (video game series)
Albion, a place in the game Destroy All Humans! 2
Albion, a realm in the game Dark Age of Camelot
Albion, a nation of Warhammer Fantasy
Albion, a private security company in Watch Dogs: Legion
 Albion, a Marvel Comics character and X-Men villain in the New Excalibur series
 Albion, a setting in The Familiar of Zero Japanese light novels by Noboru Yamaguchi 
 Albion, a sword in Robin of Sherwood
 Albion, a gang in Captain Earth

Games
Albion (video game), a 1995 game and its fictional setting
Albion Online, a 2017 medieval fantasy MMORPG
X3: Albion Prelude, a 2011 space flight simulator whose main storyline heavily features a planet named Albion (also central in the sequel X Rebirth)

Literature
Albion (comics), a 2005 comic-book limited series
Albion (novel series), a trilogy of historical novels by Patrick McCormack
Albion (magazine), devoted to the board game Diplomacy, published from 1969 to 1975

Music
The Albion Band, a former English folk band
Ferry Corsten or Albion, electronic music producer/DJ
Albion: An Anthology, a 2009 compilation album by the English folk musician and composer Chris Wood
Albion (Ginger Wildheart album), 2013
Albion (Ten album), 2014
"Albion" (song), a 2005 song by Babyshambles
"Albion", a piece for brass band by Jan Van der Roost
Albion, a 2013 album by Ginger Wildheart

Businesses
Albion Co., Ltd., a Japanese cosmetics manufacturer and distributor
Albion Ale House, a Grade II listed public house in Conwy, North Wales
Albion Brewery, also known as Albion Ale And Porter Brewing Company, a former beer brewery in San Francisco, active 1870 to 1919
Albion Colliery, a former coal mine in Wales
Albion Fine Foods, a British company owned by Vestey Holdings
Albion Hotel (disambiguation)
Hotel Albion, Portland, Oregon, United States
Albion Motors, a vehicle manufacturer in Glasgow, Scotland 1899–1980
Albion Swords, an American company manufacturing European sword replicas
Albion, a brand of agricultural machinery by David Brown Ltd. 
Albion Shipping Company, a 19th-century shipping company of P Henderson & Company 
Albion Yard, a Charles Hill & Sons shipbuilding yard in Bristol, England, 1848–1977

People
Albion (given name), including list of people with the name
Mark Albion (born 1951), American writer
Robert G. Albion (1896–1983), Harvard's first professor of Oceanic History

Places

Australia
Albion, Queensland, a suburb of Brisbane
Albion, Queensland (Richmond Shire), a locality
Albion, Victoria, a suburb of Melbourne

Canada
Albion, British Columbia, a neighbourhood of Maple Ridge
Albion Falls, Ontario, a waterfall
Albion Township, Ontario, in the town of Caledon, in the Greater Toronto Area

United States
Albion, California, a census-designated place
Albion River, California
Albion, Idaho, a city
Albion, Illinois, a city
Albion Precinct, Edwards County, Illinois, a defunct precinct
Albion, Indiana, a town
Albion, Scott County, Indiana, an unincorporated community
Albion, Iowa, a city
Albion, Kansas, a ghost town
Albion, Maine, a town
Albion, Michigan, a city
Albion, an early name in the history of Minneapolis, Minnesota
Albion, Nebraska, a city
Albion, New Jersey, an unincorporated community
Albion, Orleans County, New York, a town
Albion (village), New York
Albion, Oswego County, New York, a town
Albion, North Carolina, an unincorporated community
Albion, Ohio, an unincorporated community
Albion, Oklahoma, a town
Albion, Pennsylvania, a borough
Albion, Rhode Island, a village and historic district in Lincoln
Albion (Winnsboro, South Carolina), a plantation home on the National Register of Historic Places
Albion, Texas, an unincorporated community
Albion, Washington, a town
Albion, Dane County, Wisconsin, a town
Albion (community), Wisconsin, an unincorporated community
Albion, Jackson County, Wisconsin, a town
Albion, Trempealeau County, Wisconsin, a town
Albion Township (disambiguation)

Elsewhere
Mount Albion (disambiguation)
Albion, Guyana, a town
Albion, Mauritius, a village in Rivière Noire District, Mauritius
 (15760) 1992 QB1, the first discovered trans-Neptunian object

Schools
Albion College, a liberal arts college in Albion, Michigan, United States
Albion State Normal School, a former public institution of higher learning in Albion, Idaho, United States
Albion High School (disambiguation)
Albion Academy, a former academy in Albion, Wisconsin, United States
The Albion Academy, a coeducational secondary school in Pendleton, Salford, England

Ships
List of ships named Albion
HMS Albion, the name of several Royal Navy ships

Albion-class landing platform dock

Sports

UK
Albion Rovers F.C., a Scottish Football League team from the North Lanarkshire town of Coatbridge
Albion Rovers F.C. (Newport), a Welsh football team from the city of Newport
Brighton & Hove Albion F.C., an English professional football club based in the city of Brighton & Hove, Sussex
Burton Albion F.C., a professional English association football club based in the town of Burton upon Trent, Staffordshire
Forfar Albion F.C., a Scottish football club based in Forfar, Angus
Ossett Albion A.F.C., an English football team in the Northern Premier League Division One North, based in Ossett, West Yorkshire
Plymouth Albion R.F.C., a rugby union club who play in Plymouth, England
Shepshed Albion F.C., a defunct English football club also known as Shepshed Charterhouse from 1975 to 1992
Stirling Albion F.C., a Scottish football club currently playing in the Scottish First Division
Tadcaster Albion A.F.C., an English football club based in Tadcaster, North Yorkshire
West Bromwich Albion F.C., an English professional association football club based in West Bromwich, West Midlands
Witton Albion F.C., an English football team in the Northern Premier League Division One North based in Northwich, Cheshire

Elsewhere
Albion Football Club (WRFL), an Australian rules football club based in the Melbourne suburb of Albion
Albion Cricket Club (Dunedin), a cricket club based in Dunedin, New Zealand
Albion F.C., a football club based in Montevideo, Uruguay

Transportation
Albion Municipal Airport, Albion, Nebraska, United States
Albion railway station (disambiguation)
Albion Road (disambiguation)
Albion Viaduct, a railway viaduct in Melbourne, Australia

Other uses
(15760) Albion, a minor planet
Albion Correctional Facility, a medium security women's prison in Albion, New York, United States
Operation Albion, a 1917 German operation to occupy the West Estonian Archipelago
Albion (Blake), the primeval man in William Blake's mythology
Alebion or Albion, a son of Poseidon in Greek mythology
Albion (Winnsboro, South Carolina), United States, a plantation house on the National Register of Historic Places
Albion (journal), a former peer-reviewed journal about British history
Albion: The Origins of the English Imagination, a 2002 non-fiction work by Peter Ackroyd
Albion, an equatorium constructed by Richard of Wallingford in 1326

See also

Albion Park, New South Wales, Australia, a suburb
New Albion (disambiguation)
Blue Albion, a breed of cattle
Albiones, a pre-Roman Celtic tribe of the Iberian Peninsula